Mohammad Mahamudin ( – 13 November 2018) was an Indian politician from West Bengal belonging to Communist Party of India (Marxist). He was elected thrice as a member of the West Bengal Legislative Assembly.

Biography
Mahamuddin was elected as a member of the  West Bengal Legislative Assembly from Chopra in 1987. He also elected from that constituency in 1991 and 1996.

Mahamuddin died on 13 November 2018 at the age of 84.

References

Communist Party of India (Marxist) politicians from West Bengal
West Bengal MLAs 1987–1991
West Bengal MLAs 1991–1996
West Bengal MLAs 1996–2001
1930s births
2018 deaths
People from Dakshin Dinajpur district